Pitheci Portus was a town of ancient Thrace, inhabited during Roman times. 

Its site is located to the South of Sariyer, on the European side of Istanbul.

References

Populated places in ancient Thrace
Former populated places in Turkey
Roman towns and cities in Turkey
History of Istanbul Province